Two ships of the United States Navy have been named Bucareli Bay for the bay off the western coast of Prince of Wales Island in Alaska.

  was also a Casablanca-class escort carrier, renamed .

Sources
 

United States Navy ship names